Hajjiabad (also Romanized as Ḩājjīābād) is a village in Tus Rural District, in the Central District of Mashhad County, Razavi Khorasan Province, Iran. At the 2006 census, its population was 870, in 234 families.

References 

Populated places in Mashhad County